Dennis-Alexandru Perju (born 20 October 1994) is a Romanian rugby union football player. He plays mostly as a centre for professional SuperLiga club Steaua București but can also play as a wing. He also plays for Romania's national team, the Oaks, making his international debut during Matchday 2 of the 2016 World Rugby Nations Cup in a match against Los Teros.

Career
Before joining Steaua București, Dennis Perju played for L'Aquila and for CUS Torino Rugby in Italy.

References

External links

1994 births
Living people
People from Bacău
Romanian rugby union players
Romania international rugby union players
CSA Steaua București (rugby union) players
Rugby union wings
Rugby union centres